Walk the River is the third full-length album from the British indie rock band Guillemots. It was released on 18 April 2011 in the United Kingdom and reached number 26 on the UK Albums Chart. The album has been preceded by the releases of two tracks: first single off the album "The Basket", and a free download of the album's title track via the band's official website.

Track listing

Critical response

The album has received widely positive reviews in the media. Q gave it 4 stars, stating that it's "restlessly inventive and soaring melodic". Mojo also gave it 4 stars, commending it on its depth in songwriting. The Fly were taken by surprise by the album's approach to Shoegaze and how Fyfe Dangerfield has moved on in songwriting since his success with his solo album Fly Yellow Moon, giving it 7 out of 10.

External links
 Official site
 Myspace site
 Polydor Records

2011 albums
Guillemots (band) albums
Polydor Records albums